Odontomyia interrupta is a species of soldier fly in the family Stratiomyidae.

Distribution
Canada, United States.

References

Stratiomyidae
Insects described in 1811
Diptera of North America
Taxa named by Guillaume-Antoine Olivier